Bahoz Erdal, also known as Fahman Husain (also spelled Fehman Hüseyin) (born 3 August 1969), in Kurdistan in Syria is a top commander in the Kurdistan Workers' Party (PKK). He is originally from Dêrik in Syrian Kurdistan.

Biography
Born in 1969, Hüseyin is a Syrian Kurd who studied medicine at university – thus nicknamed 'Doctor' – in Damascus. Following PKK's leader Abdullah Öcalan's capture in 1999, he shared the leadership of the PKK with Murat Karayılan and Cemil Bayık, commanding the armed branch HPG particularly.

He served as the head of the People's Defence Forces (HPG), the PKK's armed wing from June 2004 until July 2009, when he was replaced by Sofi Nurettin.

Since 2004 he has been part of the three-man PKK Executive Committee, including acting PKK leader Murat Karayılan and PKK co-founder Cemil Bayik, who preceded Bahoz Erdal as the PKK's military commander.

Some Turkish security analysts claimed in 2011 that Erdal is the leader of the Kurdistan Freedom Hawks (TAK).

Since 28 October 2015, he has been in the red category of the "Most Wanted Terrorists" list published by the Ministry of Interior of the Republic of Turkey. The Ministry announced that a reward of up to 10 million TL will be given to the person or persons who catch him or share information that will result in his capture.

Alleged July 2016 assassination 

According to Turkey's official state news agency Anadolu Agency, and the Daily Sabah citing Anadolu Agency, he was killed in Syria on 8 July 2016. A person under the name of Halid el Hasekavi, spokesman of an anti-regime armed group named Tel Hamis Brigades, told an AA correspondent that Hüseyin was allegedly targeted near northern Syrian city of Qamishli. He claimed that Hüseyin's car was blown up at 8:30 p.m. on 8 July, being killed along with eight people including his guards. On 12 July, the Yeni Şafak quoted the Turkish MİT intelligence service as the source of this story. Sources close to PKK denied these claims.

The story was debunked when Erdal gave a radio interview on 13 July and later thoroughly deconstructed as fake by international media.

He appeared on a video in April 2017 and addressed Turkish citizens about the 2017 Turkish constitutional referendum.

References

External links 
 

1969 births
Syrian Kurdish people
Members of the Kurdistan Workers' Party
Living people
Kurdish military personnel
Apoists

People charged with terrorism